Thangarathinam is a 1960 Indian Tamil-language drama film directed by S. S. Rajendran. The film stars S. S. Rajendran and Vijayakumari.

Plot
Thangam is a young man from a rich family studying in Chennai. When he goes to his village during holidays, he meets a poor girl, Rathinam. Both becomes lovers. He returns to Chennai before his father Mirasudhar Nallamuthu Pillai learns of his love affair. Selvam is Thangam's friend. Two girls, Seethai and Meena are in love with Selvam. But Selvam loves Seethai. Meena is in frustration. Meena receives a telegram that her mother is not well. When she goes to the village, her mother has already died. Her father Vadivelu is unable to settle his debts. Mirasudhar Nallamuthu Pillai offers to help them and in return he weds Seetha. Thangam learns that his aged father has married a young girl. He returns home to find Seetha as his step mother. He thinks that Seetha has cheated his friend Selvam. He leaves home and get himself involved in social reform activities. He works as a labourer for his living. He learns that his girl friend Rathinam and her father Veerasamy were ill-treated by his father. He consoles them and promises to Veerasamy that he will marry Rathinam. Selvam comes to the village in search of Thangam. When he goes to Thangam's home, he finds Seetha there and thinks Thangam has married her. Mirasudhar attacks Selvam and chases him out. Selvam thinks Thangam has cheated him and searches for him with a knife. How these problems are settled forms the rest of the story.

Cast 
The following lists are compiled from the database of Film News Anandan and from the film's song book.

S. S. Rajendran
Vijayakumari
K. A. Thangavelu
M. N. Rajam
Prem Nazir
V. K. Ramasamy
Nagesh
P. Hemalatha
Pushpamala
 Meenakshi
V. Nagayya (cameo appearance)
T. V. Narayanasamy
S. S. Sivasooriyan
P. S. Thedchanamoorthy
K. R. Rathinam
K. R. Seetharaman
T. N. Krishnan
K. G. Archunan
K. T. Rajagopal
S. S. Subburam
S. A. G. Sami
Krishnan
Perumal Raju
Thangappan
Rangaraju

Soundtrack
The music was composed by K. V. Mahadevan, while the lyrics were penned by Thanjai N. Ramaiah Dass, A. Maruthakasi, Kudandhai Krishnamoorthy and S. S. Rajendran. A folk song also was included in the film.

References

External links 
 

1960 drama films
1960 films
1960s Tamil-language films
Films scored by K. V. Mahadevan
Indian drama films